Curry Burns (born February 12, 1981) is a former American football safety.

College careers
Burns played college football at the University of Louisville and appeared in 74 games with 29 starts.  He was part of a defensive secondary that tallied 52 interceptions over three seasons to rank second nationally.  He finished his career with 336 tackles, eight interceptions, 16 passes defended, three forced fumbles, one fumble recovery and four blocked kicks.  Burns ranks 10th on the school's career-record list in tackles.  He was an All-Conference USA selection as a senior, posting career-high 111 tackles.

Professional career
Drafted in the seventh round of the 2003 NFL Draft by the Texans, Curry played safety.  In his first year, he saw action in one game for Houston, made NFL debut in season finale against Indianapolis, recording one special teams tackle.

Next year played in eight games for the New York Giants, with two starts at free safety.  He finished with 23 tackles (19 solo), one interception, one pass defended, and five special teams tackles.

In 2005, he signed with the Washington Redskins as an unrestricted free agent in September 2005 and spent the season on the team's practice squad.  He was released by the Redskins on October 16, 2006, to make room for free agent Troy Vincent.  Burns was signed by New Orleans Saints as free agent Friday May 25, 2007.  Three months later Burns was waived on Saturday September 1, 2007 for undisclosed reasons.

Personal life
He is the half-brother of Elvis Dumervil who plays for the Baltimore Ravens.

1981 births
Living people
Miami Jackson Senior High School alumni
American football safeties
Louisville Cardinals football players
Houston Texans players
New York Giants players
Players of American football from Miami